The New York State Department of Motor Vehicles (NYSDMV or DMV) is the department of the New York state government responsible for vehicle registration, vehicle inspections, driver's licenses, learner’s permits, photo ID cards, and adjudicating traffic violations. Its regulations are compiled in title 15 of the New York Codes, Rules and Regulations.

Administrative courts
The Traffic Violations Bureau (TVB) is an administrative court that adjudicates non-criminal traffic violations (other than parking violations) in New York City.

Division of Field Investigation
The Division of Field Investigation (DFI) is the criminal investigations arm of the DMV. Its investigators/law enforcement officers combat auto theft, identity theft, and fraudulent document related crimes in New York. These investigators are armed New York State peace officers with state wide authority to enforce laws and handle investigations. Motor Vehicle Investigators also perform fraud detection, investigate auto theft rings. Motor Vehicle Investigator's perform a variety of criminal investigations, field inspections, inventories of seized properties, odometer fraud, identity verification, fraudulent document detection, vehicle theft examinations.

Registration
The New York State Vehicle and Traffic Law gives DMV the authority to suspend registrations for habitual and persistent violations of the law. In 2015-2016, the DMV enacted regulations allowing the suspensions of registration for people who fail to pay 5 road charge fines (toll violations) within 18 months.

Real ID Act
In order to travel on U.S. domestic flights or enter federal buildings, by May 3, 2023, state residents must possess a Real ID Act compliant identification card. The New York DMV is encouraging residents to arrange to upgrade their ID ahead of the deadline at the cost of a replacement ID. Currently, the fee to apply for or renew a REAL ID is the same as the fee for a standard New York State DMV license.  State residents who are United States citizens can also apply for an Enhanced ID, which allows them to cross the border from Canada or Mexico, as well as some Caribbean countries, for an additional $30 fee.  Under the Real ID Act, people applying for a Real ID compliant license must provide additional proof of their identity and residence.  New Yorkers must apply for a REAL ID or Enhanced license by going into a DMV office and presenting the necessary documentation, even if they currently have a non-upgraded license.  They may not apply online or by mail.  The DMV has created a "Document Guide", a tool on its website that will tell people what documents they need to apply for a Real ID or Enhanced ID.

List of commissioners
Charles A. Harnett 1924–1938
Carroll E. Mealey 1938–1942
John Splain 1942–1943
Clifford J. Fletcher 1943–1951
James R. Macduff 1952–1955
Joseph P. Kelly 1955–1959
William S. Hults, Jr. 1959–December 31, 1966
Vincent L. Tofany January 1, 1967–1973
James Melton 1975–1981
Patricia B. Adduci
John Passidomo
Richard E. Jackson 1995–2000
Raymond P. Martinez 2000–2005
Nancy Naples 2006–2007
David Swarts 2007–2010
Barbara Fiala 2011–2014
Vacant 2014–2019
 Mark J.F. Schroeder 2019–present

See also

Vehicle registration plates of New York

References

External links
Official website
Department of Motor Vehicles in the New York Codes, Rules and Regulations
 Department of Motor Vehicles in Open NY (https://data.ny.gov/)
DMV Office Phone Numbers

Motor vehicle registration agencies
Motor